Rustai-ye Taleqani (also Romanized as Rūstāī-ye Ţāleqānī; also known as Ţāleqānī) is a village in Mahur Rural District, Mahvarmilani District, Mamasani County, Fars Province, Iran. At the 2006 census, its population was 283, in 58 families.

References 

Populated places in Mamasani County